Satien Tummue ((b. October 2, 1969 — ) is a Luk Thung singer. He performed many popular songs including "Yoo Tee Nai Kor Ngao Dai", "Jeb Mue Rai Kor Tore Ma", "Hua Jai Puen Din", "Chok Dee Tee Mee Ther Rak", "Kor Apay Tee Luem Cha" and "Fark Jai Kub Duen Jang".

He is also sometimes known by his nickname, Aor or the epithet Sin La Pin Rak Ya (ศิลปินรากหญ้า).

Life and career
Sathien Makan or Sathien Supakun, nicknamed Sathien and under Grammy Gold label, a subsidiary of GMM Grammy, is a 52-year-old Luk Thung singer born on October 2, 1969. He lives in Huai Thap Than District, Srisaket Province. During high school at Kamphaeng School, he attended electronic industry and practiced music. He loved guitars and played for the school's international band. He would practice playing in the evening after school with a friend named Pr at their teacher's house. After high school, he attended and graduated from Ubon Ratchathani Teachers College (1992, was bestowed on the title of "Ubon Ratchathani Rajabhat Institute", the academic year 2004 was raised as "Ubon Ratchathani Rajabhat University") and received the teacher service. For a while, he resigned and joined a group of country music artists for life - Lanna, the owner of the nickname “Sathien Thitthathimmo”, currently operates a restaurant and recording room. Thorung, a studio at Muang District, Sisaket Province, has released his first solo album. The dream was reached and he released his first album in 2004.

The last work he did before the break was his seventh album in 2012 under Grammy Gold. He is an artist and a background worker for other artists at Grammy Gold.

References

External links
 

1969 births
Living people
Satien Tummue
Satien Tummue
Satien Tummue
Satien Tummue